Kuturmi, or Ada, is a Plateau language cluster of Kachia LGA, Kaduna State, Nigeria.

Varieties
Varieties are:

Ikryo (Aclo, Aklo, West Kuturmi), spoken in two villages of Kachia LGA
Obiro (East Kuturmi), spoken in Antara village, Kachia LGA

References

External links
Kuturmi wordlist

Central Plateau languages
Languages of Nigeria